Bozhinov Glacier is the 5 km long and 2.5 km wide glacier on Danco Coast in Graham Land on the Antarctic Peninsula situated north of Krebs Glacier and south of Nobile Glacier.  Flowing westwards to enter Gerlache Strait at Kapisturia Cove in Charlotte Bay.

The glacier is named for the Bulgarian pioneer of aviation Georgi Bozhinov (1879-1955) whose innovative aircraft was patented in France in 1912.

Location
British mapping in 1978.

See also
 List of glaciers in the Antarctic
 Glaciology

Maps
 British Antarctic Territory. Scale 1:200000 topographic map No. 3198. DOS 610 - W 64 60. Tolworth, UK, 1978.
 Antarctic Digital Database (ADD). Scale 1:250000 topographic map of Antarctica. Scientific Committee on Antarctic Research (SCAR). Since 1993, regularly upgraded and updated.

References
 Bozhinov Glacier. SCAR Composite Gazetteer of Antarctica.
 Bulgarian Antarctic Gazetteer. Antarctic Place-names Commission. (details in Bulgarian, basic data in English)

External links
 Bozhinov Glacier. Copernix satellite image

Bulgaria and the Antarctic
Glaciers of Danco Coast